The  International League season took place from April to September 2002.

The Durham Bulls defeated the Buffalo Bisons to win the league championship.

Attendance
Buffalo - 642,272
Charlotte - 303,321
Columbus - 490,390
Durham - 519,122
Indianapolis - 571,984
Louisville - 659,340
Norfolk - 500,192
Ottawa - 191,305
Pawtucket - 615,540
Richmond - 452,961
Rochester - 421,494
Scranton/W.B. - 466,342
Syracuse - 413,566
Toledo - 567,804

Playoffs

Division Series
North Division Champions (Scranton)
IL Wild Card Champions (Buffalo)

Winner: Buffalo

South Division Champions (Durham)
West Division Champions (Toledo)

Winner: Durham

Championship series
Buffalo
Durham

Winner: Durham; first title for Durham in any baseball league at all.

References

External links
International League official website

 
International League seasons